Jeffrey Anderson is the name of:

Jeffrey Anderson (radio producer) (1928–2014), Canadian music critic, journalist, and television and radio producer
Jeffrey D. Anderson, American anthropologist
Jeffrey Anderson (game designer), American video game designer
Jeff Anderson (born 1970), American film actor
Jeff Anderson (singer) (born 1978), American singer 
Jeff Anderson (tuba player) (born 1962), American tuba player
Jeff Anderson (attorney), American attorney

See also
Geoff Anderson (born 1944), English footballer
Geoff Anderson (cricketer) (born 1939), New Zealand cricketer